Barbara Carrera (born Barbara Kingsbury) is an American actress, model and artist. She starred in the films The Master Gunfighter (1975), Embryo (1976), The Island of Dr. Moreau (1977), Condorman (1981), I, the Jury (1982) and Lone Wolf McQuade (1983), and is perhaps best remembered for her performance as SPECTRE assassin Fatima Blush in Never Say Never Again (1983); for the first and last of those movies, Carrera was nominated for a Golden Globe Award. Carrera is also known for playing Clay Basket in the big-budget miniseries Centennial (1978–79), and as Angelica Nero on the ninth season of CBS prime time soap opera Dallas (1985–86).

Early life
Barbara Kingsbury was born in Bluefields, Nicaragua. Some sources give her birth year as 1947 or 1951, but most list 1945. She prefers to say 1953. Her mother, Florencia Carrera, was Nicaraguan, and her father, Louis Kingsbury, was an American who worked for the American embassy in Nicaragua.

Sometime after the age of ten, Carrera moved to the United States to live with her father. She moved to New York at the age of 15.

Career
Kingsbury began a career as a model at the Eileen Ford agency at the age of 17, at which point she changed her last name to her mother's maiden name, Carrera. Her first film role was as a fashion model in Puzzle of a Downfall Child (1970), which fared poorly at the box office. In 1972, she appeared on the screen in a publicity role for Chiquita bananas. Carrera has appeared on the pages and covers of such magazines as Vogue, Paris Match, Harper's Bazaar, and twice posed for Playboy (July 1977 and March 1982).

In 1976, Carrera earned her first Golden Globe nomination ("New Star of the Year - Actress") for her role in The Master Gunfighter. She later played in such films as The Island of Dr. Moreau, Lone Wolf McQuade, Condorman, Point of Impact, Tryst and Embryo. For her portrayal of the villainess Fatima Blush in the James Bond film Never Say Never Again, she earned a 1984 Golden Globe nomination for "Best Performance by an Actress in a Supporting Role in a Motion Picture". She worked opposite Laurence Olivier in Wild Geese II the following year.

On television, Carrera played a part in the soap opera Dallas as Angelica Nero, and more prominently, in the historical miniseries Centennial in 1978 and Masada (opposite Peter O'Toole and Peter Strauss) in 1981. These roles brought her to the mainstream attention of American audiences. She also starred as Emma Forsayth in the miniseries Emma: Queen of the South Seas in 1988. Since Paradise (2004), Carrera has not appeared in films or television.

In 1989, Carrera starred with Bette Davis in Wicked Stepmother, Davis's final film role. During filming, Davis fell ill and the script was rewritten for Carrera.
"Instead, he rewrote the script to minimize Davis’ role as the wicked witch who marries into an unsuspecting family, becoming the children’s stepmother. In the original script, Davis was going to turn a cat into the beautiful Barbara Carrera. In the new version, Davis herself turns into Carrera, who assumes Davis’ lines for the bulk of the film."

In 1997, Carrera was appointed Ambassador-at-Large for Nicaragua by then-president Arnoldo Alemán.

Carrera is also an artist and her work has been showcased in the Makk Galleries, with Americo Makk, in Beverly Hills, California since the 1980s, and the Roy Miles Gallery in London, England. In May 2002, her works were exhibited at the Hollywood Entertainment Museum and have typically been sold for up to $8,000.

Personal life
Carrera has been married and divorced three times, her spouses being:
 Otto Kurt Freiherr von Hoffman. They married in New York City in 1966 (religiously in 1969) and divorced in 1972 (religiously in 1983).
 Uva Harden (born 1941), a German fashion model and actor. Married in 1972, they divorced in July 1976.
 Nicholas Mark Mavroleon, a Greek shipping magnate, a few years her junior, who is the younger and only surviving son of Manuel Basil Mavroleon (aka "Bluey") by his second wife, Gioconda de Gallardo y Castro. They married on March 16, 1983, and later divorced.

Between marriages, Carrera dated Robert De Niro, Robert Evans, Alexander Godunov, Philip Niarchos, Richard Gere and Ryan O'Neal. After her third marriage, she was involved with Henry Percy, 11th Duke of Northumberland.

Carrera has no children.

Filmography

Film

Television

Notes

References

External links

 
 
 
 

Year of birth uncertain
American female models
American film actresses
American television actresses
Hispanic and Latino American actresses
Nicaraguan emigrants to the United States
Living people
20th-century American actresses
21st-century American actresses
Nicaraguan people of American descent
People from Bluefields
1944 births